Nicholas John Delmonico (born July 12, 1992) is an American former professional baseball outfielder and current hitting coach of the Winston-Salem Dash, the High-A Chicago White Sox affiliate. He played in Major League Baseball (MLB) for the Chicago White Sox from 2017 to 2020.

Career
Delmonico attended Farragut High School in Knoxville, Tennessee. In the summer of 2010, he played for the United States national baseball team in the 2010 World Junior Baseball Championship.

Baltimore Orioles
The Baltimore Orioles selected Delmonico in the sixth round of the 2011 Major League Baseball draft. He broke a commitment to the University of Georgia by signing with the Orioles for a $1,525,000 signing bonus. He did not attend college.

Delmonico played for the Delmarva Shorebirds of the Class A South Atlantic League in 2012. He played in the league's all-star game and was named the most valuable player. He began the 2013 season with the Frederick Keys of the Class A-Advanced Carolina League.

Milwaukee Brewers
On July 7, 2013, the Orioles traded Delmonico to the Milwaukee Brewers for Francisco Rodríguez.

In 2014, the Brewers assigned Delmonico to the Brevard County Manatees of the Class A-Advanced Florida State League. Delmonico tested positive for Adderall in July 2014, and was suspended for 50 games. He had tried to stop using the medication, which he was prescribed for attention deficit disorder, but became addicted and failed to renew his exemption for Adderall from the drug testing policy. He asked the Brewers for his release, initially not intending to continue playing baseball.

Chicago White Sox
The Brewers released Delmonico in February 2015, and he signed with the White Sox. He started the season with the Kannapolis Intimidators of the South Atlantic League and was promoted to the Birmingham Barons of the Class AA Southern League. After starting the 2016 season with Birmingham, and was promoted to the Charlotte Knights of the Class AAA International League in May. He returned to Charlotte in 2017.

The White Sox promoted Delmonico to the major leagues on August 1, 2017. He debuted that day and recorded his first major league hit, off Toronto Blue Jays pitcher Ryan Tepera. On August 3, 2017, Delmonico hit his first career MLB home run against Rick Porcello of the Boston Red Sox. Delmonico reached base in each of his first 13 games, and hit six home runs in his first 19 games.

On August 18, 2017, DelMonico hit an inside the park home run against the Texas Rangers.  https://www.mlb.com/video/nicky-delmonico-hits-an-inside-the-park-home-run-5-on-a-line-drive-to-shallow-right-field

On September 27, Delmonico hit a walk-off game winning 2-run home run against the Los Angeles Angels of Anaheim. The home run allowed the Minnesota Twins to clinch a playoff spot.

After starting the 2019 season in the minor leagues, Delmonico suffered a torn labrum and underwent season-ending surgery on June 4. On June 10, 2019, Delmonico was released by the White Sox.

On December 16, 2019, Delmonico signed a minor league contract to return to the Chicago White Sox and was invited to spring training. Delmonico made the Opening Day roster for the White Sox in 2020. He was designated for assignment on August 28, 2020, following the acquisition of Jarrod Dyson. He became a free agent on November 2, 2020.

Cincinnati Reds
On February 3, 2021, Delmonico signed a minor league contract with the Cincinnati Reds organization and was invited to Spring Training. Delmonico slashed .221/.312/.382 in 19 games for the Triple-A Louisville Bats before he was released on June 1.

Coaching career
On February 2, 2022, Delmonico was named as the hitting coach for the Winston-Salem Dash, the High-A Chicago White Sox affiliate.

Personal life
He is the son of Rod Delmonico. His two older brothers, Joey and Tony, are both baseball players.
Delmonico married Jessica Martin in October 2021.

References

External links

1992 births
Living people
Baseball players from Knoxville, Tennessee
Farragut High School alumni
Major League Baseball third basemen
Major League Baseball outfielders
Chicago White Sox players
Delmarva Shorebirds players
Frederick Keys players
Brevard County Manatees players
Kannapolis Intimidators players
Birmingham Barons players
Glendale Desert Dogs players
Charlotte Knights players